The 2010 Dalian Aerbin F.C. season was the team's first season in history. Dalian Aerbin topped the 2010 China League Two through promotion playoffs, and gained promotion into the China League One.

Overview
Dalian Aerbin F.C. was established in 2009 by Dalian Aerbin Group and its owner, Zhao Mingyang. The team would participate in the 2010 China League Two. Li Ming was appointed as the general manager, while many former footballers and managers from Dalian were appointed.  The team set bold target to promote into the Chinese Super League.

Players

Technical Staff

China League Two

Group stage

League table

Fixtures and results

Promotion playoffs

Semi-finals

First leg

Second leg

Final

References

Dalian Professional F.C. seasons
Dalian Aerbin F.C.